Johanna Nestor (born 24 November 1917 in Mukachevo, Bereg county, Austria-Hungary as Johanna "Hanna" Müller; died 11 October 2012) was an Austrian ambassador. As one of the first ambassadors in the country, she was considered a pioneer of modern diplomacy in Austria. Nestor was an ambassador to the Republic of Austria in New Delhi, India (1966-1970), in Tel Aviv, Israel (1972-1976) and in Dublin, Ireland (1979-1982). Johanna Nestor was Commander (Grand Officer) of the order of knights from the Holy Sepulcher in Jerusalem.

References

Austrian women ambassadors
20th-century Austrian women
1917 births
2012 deaths
Ambassadors of Austria to India
Ambassadors of Austria to Ireland
Ambassadors of Austria to Israel